Mofuike Tuungafasi (born circa 1963) is a former Tongan rugby union player. He played as a lock.

Career
Tuungafasi had his first cap for Tonga during the match against Wales, in Nuku'alofa, on 12 June 1986. He also played in the 1987 Rugby World Cup, playing two matches, being the match against Ireland, in Brisbane his last international cap.

Personal life
Mofuike is the father of four sons who play rugby union for Auckland in the Mitre 10 Cup: Ofa Tuungafasi, Victor Tuungafasi, Isi Tuungafasi and Seleti Tuungafasi, with Ofa being also a New Zealand international for the All Blacks.

Notes

External links

1963 births
Living people
Tongan expatriates in New Zealand
Tongan rugby union players
Rugby union locks
Tonga international rugby union players